Park Jung-bae (born 19 February 1967) is a South Korean former international footballer who played professionally as a defender for LG Cheetahs, Pusan Daewoo Royals and Ulsan Hyundai Horang-i. He represented South Korea at the 1994 FIFA World Cup.

External links
 
 
 

1967 births
Living people
South Korean footballers
Association football defenders
South Korea international footballers
1994 FIFA World Cup players
FC Seoul players
Busan IPark players
Ulsan Hyundai FC players
K League 1 players